Koninklijke Football Club Zwarte Leeuw (lit. Royal Football Club Black Lion) is a Belgian football club from Rijkevorsel. The club is affiliated to the Belgian Football Association with basic number 1124 and has yellow-black as team colors.

History
The club was on 25 April 1926 established as Athletics Club Black Leeuwkens Rijckevorsel . On November 18, 1927 the club joined the Football League as Black Lion Rijckevorsel and received basic number 1124. In 1972 the club took the name FC Rijkevorsel to. Three years later the name was changed again in FC Black Lion; Rijkevorsel name was omitted. Following the fiftieth anniversary should the club in 1976, the title Royal for the FC still turn and became KFC Black Lion.

In 1974 the club was able for the first time to the provincial series to come and played thirteen years in the promotion series where the club five times second place managed to achieve. Black Lion won in 1987 ended his set, and played as in 1987/88 for the first time in the third class. The team took not just a stunt when the title was to be left to one point after Germinal Ekeren. The following season, the club have six points ahead of FC Heist athletic champion and so opened the gate of the Second Division.

There the club continue its momentum and surprised everyone by taking off with as many points as the third road Racing Genk. In the final round for the promotion Black Lion was second behind Genk and saw a new promotion to his nose passing. The success did not last and the next season was the club's fight against relegation, a battle in 1993 lost. The Bosman lost the club, like many other clubs, much money and this was reflected in the sporting results. Rather than return to battle for the second class promotion the club just like the last three years fighting against relegation. Had Black Lion finished in fourteenth place and normally need to place through the final round ticket for the next season to secure, but by the second class expanded from 16 to 18 clubs Black Lion was saved. The following season the club finished again on the fourteenth and could just save. In 1995, however, the degradation was inevitable.

The club moved to the next few years in the middle. In 1998/99 third place was achieved and in 1999/00 even a second. Black Lion was preparing for the final round of promotion, but was already in the first round with 1–3 defeated by SK Lebbeke. In 2001, the Vice-title was won, behind Bocholter VV. In the final round was first SK Eernegem defeated in the second round, but the club had to be won against SK Wevelgem. The following years the club away slowly sank in the middle and did it until 2005/06-second look with a tie for fifth place. However, in 2006–07 the club was relegated for the first time since 1974, out of the national series. In the 2008–09 season the club won the final round in the Antwerp First Provincial and was able to return to the national series.

Black Leo spent three seasons in Fourth Division, but in 2012 again followed a demotion to First Provincial. This time the stay is of short duration. It was immediately champion and so did one in 2013 after a season already back in Fourth Class.

Honours

Results

References

External links 
 Official website

Football clubs in Belgium
Association football clubs established in 1927
1927 establishments in Belgium